Lasianthus rostratus is a species of plant in the family Rubiaceae. It is endemic to Kerala in India.

References

rostratus
Flora of Kerala
Vulnerable plants
Taxonomy articles created by Polbot